Hunters Run is a  long 2nd order tributary to Sewickley Creek in Westmoreland County, Pennsylvania.

Course
Hunters Run rises about 0.5 miles southwest of Wyano, Pennsylvania, and then flows northerly to join Sewickley Creek about 0.5 miles northwest of Wyano.

Watershed
Hunters Run drains  of area, receives about 40.3 in/year of precipitation, has a wetness index of 355.34, and is about 40% forested.

References

 
Tributaries of the Ohio River
Rivers of Pennsylvania
Rivers of Westmoreland County, Pennsylvania
Allegheny Plateau